This list of settlements lost to floods in the Netherlands is an adapted translation of this list from Dutch, plus some additions from other sources.

"Oud-" is Dutch for "Old". If you cannot find a name, look for it under "Oud-".

Drowned villages and places in Zeeland and West-Brabant

Drowned villages and places in Noord-Beveland

Drowned villages and places in Zuid-Beveland

Drowned villages and places in the Verdronken land van Saeftinghe

Drowned villages in Schouwen (mostly in its drowned south part)

Drowned villages in the Drowned Land of Reimerswaal

Drowned villages in the Braakman

Zeeland and West Brabant: doubtful cases

Zeeland and West Brabant: drowned islands in the delta region

11 villages west of the Grote Hollandse Waard, east of the current gully of De Striene

4 or 5 drowned villages east of the Schelde

Drowned villages in the Grote Hollandse Waard alias South Hollandse Waard

9 villages on the south bank of the Maas, in Brabant and South Holland, in order from west to east

16 villages north of the Maas

Drowned villages in the former Grote Hollandse Waard alias South Hollandse Waard, whose locations are not known

One drowned village in the Hoekse Waard

Drowned villages in the Haarlemmermeer and other inland lakes

Drowned villages in waters round Wieringen, listed in records as property of Fulda Monastery, late 8th, early 9th century

Other drowned or otherwise lost villages in the Zuiderzee

Drowned villages in east and central Friesland and western Groningen provinces
Much land was lost when the Lauwerszee formed. It has been reclaimed since.

Drowned villages in Groningen province

See also
 List of flooded villages in Zeeland

External links
 Orisant website page (in Dutch)
 The Flood of 1953 in the Netherlands

Floods in the Netherlands
 

Underwater ruins
Floods